Wildflower is a 2022 American coming of age film directed by Matt Smukler and written by Jana Savage from a story from Smukler and Savage. It stars Kiernan Shipka , Dash Mihok, Charlie Plummer, Alexandra Daddario, Reid Scott, Erika Alexander, Samantha Hyde and Jacki Weaver. 

The film premiered at the Toronto International Film Festival on September 12, 2022 and was released on March 17, 2023.

Plot 
The film centers on Bea, the daughter of two intellectually disabled parents Sharon and Derek. Bea is left comatose during her senior year in high school and the film explores aspects of her life, including a romantic relationship with fellow student Ethan, through flashbacks.

Cast 

 Kiernan Shipka as Bea
 Dash Mihok as Derek
 Charlie Plummer as Ethan
 Jean Smart as Peg
 Alexandra Daddario as Joy
 Brad Garrett as Earl
 Reid Scott as Ben
 Erika Alexander 
 Samantha Hyde as Sharon
 Jacki Weaver as Loretta

Development 
The film was inspired by Smukler's niece, and was originally conceived of as a short film before being developed as a feature film. The script was optioned by Morning Moon production company in 2020, who produced the film in partnership with Limelight and Entertainment One. The filmmakers consulted disability representation activist Elaine Hall during development.

Release 
The film was screened at the Toronto International Film Festival on September 12, 2022. It was released by Momentum Pictures on March 17, 2023 in the United States and Canada.

Reception 
The film received mixed to positive reviews from critics, who praised its acting and direction while criticizing its handling of themes such as disability rights.  Metacritic, which uses a weighted average, assigned a score of 52 out of 100, based on 4 reviews indicating "mixed or average reviews".

William Bibbiani, writing for TheWrap, said that the film "can’t seem to decide if it’s a big mess or a formulaic teen drama, but when it gives us tender moments between its characters, it’s hard to really care." Lovia Gyarkye of The Hollywood Reporter wrote that the film "might not be a radical departure from films of its type, but it does offer buoyant performances from both fresh and familiar faces."

In a review titled "When Disability Representation Goes Wrong", Sarah Milner of /Film criticized its approach to portraying disability and described it as "inspiration porn." She criticized the portrayal of Sharon and Derek in particular, calling the characters "paper-thin punchlines." Wendy Ide in a review for Screen Daily compared the film to CODA (2021), but felt that Wildflower fell short in its portrayal of disabled parents by comparison. Charles Bramesco, writing for ThePlaylist.net, gave the film a C- rating and described its exploration of themes as shallow.

References

External links 

2022 films
American drama films
Films about intellectual disability
Films scored by Chad Fischer
Teen drama films
American coming-of-age drama films
2020s coming-of-age drama films